Sportvereniging Marken (Dutch for Sport Club Marken, commonly shortened to SV Marken, or just Marken) is an association football club from Marken, Netherlands. The football club was founded in 1946. It has as a Christian background, that was never included in its name. It plays in the 2017–18 Eerste Klasse Saturday after promoting in 2017.

Marken reached the quarterfinals of the KNVB Cup, where it lost 0–1 from FC Den Haag. Its best known player is Kelly Zeeman, a girl from Marken who played in SV Marken boys and men teams. She went on to win the EuroCup Women with the Netherlands women's national football team. Her father, Klaas Zeeman, had played in the match against FC Den Haag.

History

20th century 
Founded in 1946, the club played in local leagues and the Vierde Klasse until 1966. It then had only run in the Derde Klasse that lasted until 1974 and ended with SV Marken's first section championship. The season after, ending in 1975, it achieved its second championship in the Tweede Klasse and made it for 2 years into the Eerste Klasse until relegation. The second run in the Tweede lasted considerably longer and ended with a 3rd championship in 1984.

In the 1985–86 KNVB Cup SV Marken created a sensation when it reached the quarterfinals, losing just 0–1 against the professional side FC Den Haag. No club but IJsselmeervogels had made it to it so far in National Cup before SV Marken. The home game for Marken was played in neighboring Volendam so sufficient football supporters could attend the game.

From 1984 to 2006 SV Marken spent most seasons in the Eerste Klasse with 3 year and 4 year runs in the Hoofdklasse in the late 1990s and early 2000s. During these years it achieved its best league result ever, 4th place in Hoofdklasse, in 1997 and secured an Eerste Klasse championship in 2001.

21st century 
Since 2006 the Marken play mostly Tweede Klasse with an interlude in the Eerste Klasse from 2010 to 2014. In 2017 Marken promoted through playoffs from a 7th position in the Tweede Klasse into the Eerste Klasse. Next season, it returned to the Tweede Klasse.

Associated people

Chief coach
1958-1970: Jan Schilder
1970-1976: Gerrit Blotevogel
1976-1978: Jacob van der Vaart
1978-1980: Wim Verburg
1980-1983: Hennie Heerland
1983-1988: Dick Alberts
1988-1989: Frans Kramer
1989: Jan Schipper (interim)
1989-1990: Ger van Mourik
1990-1995: Peter de Waal
1995-2000: Rowdy Bakker
2000-2006: Bert van de Poppe
2006-2009: Tijs Schipper
2009-2011: Edwin Keizer
2011-2012: Saïd Ouaali
2012: Bram Berkhout (interim)
2012: Martin Boes (interim)
2012-2013: Charles Loots
2013-2017: Martin Boes
2017: Tijs Schipper
2018-2020: Ronald Dooijeweerd
Since 2020: Ron van der Velde

Notable players

 Carlos Hasselbaink (2003–04)
 Kelly Zeeman (200?–12)

References

Football clubs in the Netherlands
1946 establishments in the Netherlands
Waterland
Association football clubs established in 1946
Football clubs in North Holland